The Northwest Hoosier Conference was an IHSAA-sanctioned conference based in northwestern Indiana. The conference was started by five schools in 1968, and faced numerous membership changes during its span. The far-flung conference folded in 1998, when four of its members joined other leagues, and the other three schools were unable to find suitable replacements.

Membership List

 Lake Station was known as East Gary until 1977

External links
 John Harrell's Indiana Boys Basketball
 E.T. Pearl's Basketball Corner Boys Basketball Catalogue

Indiana high school athletic conferences
High school sports conferences and leagues in the United States
Indiana High School Athletic Association disestablished conferences
1968 establishments in Indiana
1998 disestablishments in Indiana